Cynthia L. Mahoney (also known as Sister Cindy Mahoney) (November 15, 1951 – November 1, 2006) was an Episcopalian nun and former chaplain in New York City who was present at "Ground Zero" following the terrorist attacks of September 11, 2001.

"She worked in the pit after 9/11 with the fatality team, and worked as an EMT and assisted the New York City Coroner's Office during and in the aftermath of the disaster. She spent six months at New York City's Ground Zero site ... she blessed human remains pulled from the smoldering debris of Ground Zero, prayed with the workers who painstakingly combed the rubble each day and comforted relatives of the dead when they visited the site" (as per  and also her obituary in the Associated Press).

Family
Cynthia L. Mahoney was born in Camden, South Carolina to Dallas John Mahoney Jr. and (the late) Elizabeth Jennings Mahoney.

In addition to her father, she is survived by a sister, Gaye Elizabeth Peebles of North Dakota; a brother, Dallas John Mahoney, III, Camden; a nephew, Richard Allen Peebles and a niece, Elizabeth Anne McManus.

David Worby
Sister Cindy summoned David Worby, the lawyer representing thousands of ailing "Ground Zero" workers, to her Aiken, South Carolina hospice and requested that he act as her guardian and fulfill her dying wish by overseeing her autopsy after she's gone ... [she suffered] post-traumatic stress syndrome, Worby said. She had witnessed WTC victims burn or jump to their deaths, and prayed over countless human remains ... Mahoney asked that results of her autopsy be used in any class-action lawsuit filed by ground zero workers who say the air around the site has sickened them.

Death
Mahoney died, aged 54, on November 1, 2006 at her Aiken, South Carolina home. She had been suffering from asthma, reactive airways dysfunction syndrome, chronic obstructive pulmonary disease and gastroesophageal reflux disease; she believed that the cause of these ailments was her exposure to toxic substances at "Ground Zero".

References

External links
 9/11 blogger
 Obituary 
 Obituary/Family

1951 births
2006 deaths
People from Camden, South Carolina
20th-century American Episcopalian nuns
People from Aiken, South Carolina
21st-century American Episcopalian nuns